Bythinella turca is a species of very small freshwater snail, an aquatic gastropod mollusk in the family Hydrobiidae. The species is endemic to Turkey, and is currently Critically endangered due to the clearing and "improvement" of the spring in which it lives for human recreational purposes.

References

Bythinella
Gastropods described in 1976
Endemic fauna of Turkey